Sverre Helland (18 September 1924, in Hamre – 31 December 2007) was a Norwegian politician for the Centre Party.

He was elected to the Norwegian Parliament from Hordaland in 1969, and was re-elected on three occasions. He had previously served as a deputy representative during the terms 1954–1957 and 1958–1961.

On the local level he was a member of Hamre municipality council from 1951 to 1955, then of the executive committee of Lindås municipality council from 1963 to 1971, serving as mayor from 1967 to 1969. From 1966 to 1967 he was also a member of Hordaland county council.

Outside politics he worked as an electrician.

References

1924 births
2007 deaths
Members of the Storting
Centre Party (Norway) politicians
Mayors of places in Hordaland
People from Lindås
20th-century Norwegian politicians